The Monte Choca State Forest (in ) is a , tropical moist forest, located in the municipality of Corozal in Puerto Rico. It is owned and maintained by the commonwealth of Puerto Rico and co-maintained by local conservation groups.

History
Monte Choca State Forest was declared a state forest with law number 295, passed on November 21, 2003 and is located in barrio Palos Blancos in Corozal, Puerto Rico. Gold was extracted from this region during the colonization of Puerto Rico by Spain.

Area
Its area is about 244.76 acres and it is located at one of the highest elevations of Corozal.
A study to consider strategies for the development of ecotourism at Monte Choca State Forest was done by Ortiz Ramos Hecmarie in 2011.

Flora
The area was previously used for the cultivation of minor fruits, which are currently in thickets and pastures. A total of 140 species were identified, mostly trees and shrubs. These were classified as endemic, native to the region, and exotic. Among the species of trees and native shrubs identified are Buchenavia capitata, Alchomea latifolia, Byrsonima, Casearia arborea, Cecropia Schreberiana and Miconia prasina.

Fauna
The main birds found at Monte Choca State Forest are Vireo latimeri, Icterus dominicensis, Melanerpes portorricensis, Todus mexicanus, Saurothera vieilloti, Zenaida aurita. Amphibians found here are Bufo marinus and Leptodactylus albilabris. Reptiles found here are Anolis pulchellus, Ameiva exsul, Amphisbaena caeca, Alsophis portoricensis, and Epicrates inornatus.

Activities
Photography, hiking, scientific research, and bird watching take place at Monte Choca State Forest. Youth camps are held at Monte Choca.

The Civic and Cultural Recreational Club of Palos Blancos (in ) is in Monte Choca State Forest.

See also

 List of Puerto Rico state forests
 List of National Natural Landmarks in Puerto Rico

References

Puerto Rico state forests
Protected areas established in 2003
2003 establishments in Puerto Rico
Puerto Rican moist forests
Corozal, Puerto Rico